Jongsikchunia kroppenstedtii is a bacterium from the genus Jongsikchunia which has been isolated from polluted stream in Gumi, Korea. Jongsikchunia kroppenstedtii has the ability to degrade phenol.

References

Further reading

External links
Type strain of Gordonia kroppenstedtii at BacDive -  the Bacterial Diversity Metadatabase

Mycobacteriales
Bacteria described in 2009